Hemandradenia is a genus of plant in family Connaraceae. It contains the following species (but this list may be incomplete):
 Hemandradenia chevalieri, Stapf 
 Hemandradenia mannii, Stapf

References

Connaraceae
Oxalidales genera
Taxonomy articles created by Polbot